Adam Latiff (born March 24, 1979) is a lead guitarist, rhythm guitarist, songwriter, and vocalist for a number of bands, most notable for Puddle of Mudd. He started his career in bands such as Devereux and was a touring guitar player for Eve to Adam until December 2014. Latiff is the lead vocalist and lead guitarist for a national Nirvana tribute band called Heart Shaped Box, and is also the lead vocalist for Vanilla Women, which features former members of Shinedown, Cold and Puddle of Mudd.

Career 
Latiff was friends with Puddle of Mudd's former lead guitarist, Paul Phillips whom he knew from the Jacksonville, Florida, local music scene. He had formed the band Society Red with Phillips and Damien Starkey, which was active from 2008–2011. When lead-singer Wes Scantlin discovered that he had problems sharing vocals duties with playing guitar at the same time, the band decided to hire a rhythm guitarist for the band. Latiff joined Puddle of Mudd in April 2011 toured with them until June 2012. He appears on no official releases by the band. In December 2013 it was announced that he had joined Eve to Adam.

Influences 
He cites groups such as Pink Floyd, Thin Lizzy, Foo Fighters, and Nirvana as influences and is inspired by David Gilmour, Kurt Cobain, BB King, and Eric Clapton. His interest in grunge, brought him to start his own Nirvana tribute band, called Heart Shaped Box.

He uses Gibson Les Paul, Fender Stratocaster, Telecaster and Epiphone Les Paul electric and Yari acoustic guitars.

References 

1979 births
American rock guitarists
American male guitarists
Living people
Lead guitarists
Musicians from Orlando, Florida
Guitarists from Florida
Puddle of Mudd members
21st-century American guitarists
21st-century American male musicians